The Luso-Chinese agreement of 1554 was a trade agreement between the Portuguese headed by Leonel de Sousa, and the authorities of Guangzhou headed by the Provincial Admiral (海道副使; haitao in European sources) Wang Bo (汪柏), which allowed for the legalization of Portuguese trade in China by paying taxes. It opened a new era in Sino-Portuguese relations, as Portuguese were until then officially barred from trading in the region. In 1517 an embassy led by Fernão Pires de Andrade to the Ming court failed and, after conflicts in 1521 and 1522, trade was conducted as smuggling and was fought by the authorities, who considered Portuguese to be "Folangji" (Frankish) pirates.

In their first attempts at obtaining trading posts by force, the Portuguese were defeated by the Ming Chinese at the Battle of Tunmen in Tamão or Tuen Mun in 1521 where the Portuguese lost 2 ships and Battle of Sincouwaan in Lantau Island where the Portuguese also lost 2 ships and Shuangyu in 1548 where several Portuguese were captured and near the Dongshan Peninsula in 1549 where two Portuguese junks and Galeote Pereira were captured. During these battles the Ming Chinese captured weapons from the defeated Portuguese which they then reverse engineered and mass-produced in China such as matchlock musket arquebuses which they named bird guns and Breech loading swivel guns which they named as Folangji (Frankish) cannon because the Portuguese were known to the Chinese under the name of Franks at this time. The Portuguese later returned to China peacefully and presented themselves under the name Portuguese instead of Franks and rented Macau as a trading post from China by paying annual lease of hundreds of silver taels to Ming China.

Leonel de Sousa, Captain-Major of the voyage to Japan, had reached the coast of Guangdong in 1552, where he learned that all foreigners could trade through the payment of taxes to the Chinese, except the "Folanji" including Portuguese, then considered as pirates. He then asked that they comply with the assumptions of peace and  payment of taxes, pledging to change this "name".

In 1554 Leonel de Sousa made an agreement with Guangzhou's officials to legalize the Portuguese trade, on condition of paying certain customs duties. The single surviving written evidence of this agreement is a letter from Leonel de Sousa to Infante Louis, king John III's brother, dated 1556, which states that the Portuguese undertook to pay the fees and were not to erect fortifications. The letter, one of the most important documents in the history of Sino-Portuguese relations, describes the protracted negotiations with the haitao Wang Bo, identified in Chinese sources as having accepted a bribe from the Portuguese to dry their cargo and pay taxes in Guangzhou. Both sides were available to find a solution, as the port of Guangzhou was also facing a depletion since it was closed to foreign trade. Leonel de Sousa tried to negotiate only 10% fees, which Wang Bo countered with the mandatory 20%, but focusing only on half the cargoes, to which Leonel de Sousa agreed. This treaty would be followed by the recognition of Macau as an official Portuguese warehouse in 1557. Leonel de Sousa became the second Captain-Major of Macau in 1558 (the equivalent of the later governor of Macau).

Chinese historical documents claim the Portugal used bribe to make corrupt local official in Guangzhou sign the agreement in private. Legitimacy of such claim have been debated in more recent academic studies.

See also
 China–Portugal relations
 Jorge Álvares, first Portuguese person to land in China, in 1513
 Rafael Perestrello, another early Portuguese explorer in China, arriving in 1516

References

External links
 J. M. Braga, "The First Sino-Portuguese Treaty Made by Leonel de Souza in 1554". Includes a full English translation of Leonel de Souza's letter mentioning the 1554 agreement.

Treaties of the Ming dynasty
Treaties of the Kingdom of Portugal
Portuguese Macau
Concessions in China
Commercial treaties
Free trade agreements of China
History of Macau
China–Portugal relations
Portuguese Empire
1554 in Portugal
1554 in China
1554 treaties
16th-century economic history
Economic history of China
Economic history of Macau
Economic history of Portugal